Jean Grey is a fictional character featured in seven films in the X-Men film series, starting with X-Men (2000) and ending with Dark Phoenix (2019). Jean was portrayed by Dutch actress Famke Janssen in five films, with "Jean" in The Wolverine (2013) being a posthumous hallucination in Logan's head and her appearance in X-Men: Days of Future Past (2014) being a brief flashforward scene. For the 2016 film X-Men: Apocalypse, Jean was recast with English actress Sophie Turner, who would reprise her role in Dark Phoenix in 2019.

Fictional character biography

Early life

X-Men: The Last Stand and Dark Phoenix each has a flashback sequence for Jean; because of the events of X-Men: Days of Future Past, these two flashbacks takes place in two different realities.

In the original timeline, Jean is visited by Charles Xavier (Patrick Stewart) and Erik Lehnsherr (Ian McKellen) after her parents had been concerned about what they believed to be a type of "illness" in their daughter. The girl is shown levitating multiple cars and other objects with her telekinetic powers and the two elder mutants, still friends at the time, invite Jean to the Xavier School for Gifted Youngsters. The professor later explains that while she was young, he put psychic dampers on her mind to help control a supposed "dark side" within her subconscious, preventing her powers from spiraling out of control and hurting others and herself.

In the second timeline, Jean is in a car with her parents, causing a car crash with her out-of-control mental powers, killing her mother and leaving her father afraid of his own daughter and refusing to see her later on; Jean is led to believe that her father also died in the crash. She is approached by Charles Xavier (James McAvoy), who tries to help the troubled girl, inviting her to enroll in his school.

Background and creation

Development

The casting call for the first X-Men film specifies Jean Grey's character as a "Beautiful and intelligent scientist. Also an X-Man. She has telepathic and telekinetic powers. Engaged to Cyclops and yearned for by Wolverine. Late 20s". Reports from pre-production in 1999 indicated that Jean being written to be a scientist - which she is not in the comics - was due to Beast/Hank McCoy, the team's resident scientist, originally being part of the script but dropped due to budget concerns. Since director Bryan Singer had gone with a younger, teenage portrayal of Rogue (Anna Paquin), he felt that he wanted a more mature Jean in contrast.

X-Men: The Last Stand was originally meant to be a pure adaption of The Dark Phoenix Saga storyline from the comics, but Tom Rothman considered Simon Kinberg's first outline to be "too dark, too weird, and, potentially, too expensive", and hired X2 screenwriter Zak Penn to do a rewrite; Rothman was insistent upon forcing a secondary plot, that of a cure for mutants, into the film. 20th Century Fox, which owned the film rights to the X-Men franchise, was also wary of going for a film with a female lead, as its own film Elektra (2005), as well as the Warner Bros. Pictures' film Catwoman (2004), were both critical failures while Catwoman was also a box-office bomb. Rothman feared that the nature of the Phoenix Force, being akin to a giant cosmic bird, would not appeal to the masses in a cinematic setting and decided to cut that portrayal of Jean's powers.

He also noted that Jean Grey would have committed suicide by the end, which was redundant with the ending of X2. The "Dark Phoenix" storyline was thus relegated to a secondary substory in The Last Stand. Simon Kinberg was disappointed by this outcome, calling the Dark Phoenix Saga "the ultimate X-Men story" and compared reducing it to a secondary subplot to sidelining the Book of Genesis chapter from The Bible. At one point, Matthew Vaughn (the original director of The Last Stand before Brett Ratner took over) wanted Wolverine to carry Leech with him to Jean to depower her; Penn felt that this was a cop-out and Jean had to pay for her crimes, and depowering her would also not fix her broken state of mind.

The 2019 Dark Phoenix film was originally meant to be a two part storyline, one film named only Phoenix and then Dark Phoenix as its sequel. However, the producers were unhappy with the outcome of X-Men: Apocalypse and cancelled the second sequel, forcing Simon Kinberg to compress his storyline into one film. His original ending had Jean dying at the end, but this ending was poorly received with test audiences for the film and was changed to a more hopeful outcome.

Casting

In 1998, it was rumoured that Julianne Moore was in the talks for the X-Men film at the time, presumably for the role of Jean Grey. Helen Hunt was offered the role, but turned it down, as did Charlize Theron. Peta Wilson auditioned for the role. Ashley Judd, Alicia Witt, Selma Blair, Robin Wright-Penn, Minnie Driver and Maria Bello were also all rumoured to have been auditioning for the role at the time. Lucy Lawless was invited to audition, possibly for the role of Jean, but choose to abstain due to her real life pregnancy and her otherwise busy schedule with Xena: Warrior Princess. In early August 1999, it was reported by Daily Variety that Dutch model turned actress Famke Janssen had been cast as Jean Grey.

For X-Men: Apocalypse (2016), Hailee Steinfeld, Elle Fanning, Chloë Grace Moretz and Saoirse Ronan had been among those who auditioned for the role of the younger Jean. Grace Fulton, who would go to play Mary Bromfield in the DC Extended Universe Shazam films, also auditioned to play Jean. Sophie Turner, after being cast as younger Jean, contacted Famke Janssen about advice on playing the role, but was told that there was nothing that Janssen could teach that her she didn't already know, as well as being wished good luck with the role. To prepare for the role, Turner studied how schizophrenia and dissociative identity disorder works in real life.

Characterization and special effects

In X-Men: The Last Stand, Jean's appearance when the Phoenix takes control was created by John Bruno working with Moving Picture Company. MPC used particle systems to create the effect of Jean's hair seemingly moving when the Phoenix effect takes over. MPC made hundreds of skin and eye treatments and used a 3D model of Famke Janssen's face when compositing them into Jean's digital makeup. According to Nicolas Aithadi (MPC),

The idea was that when the Dark Phoenix is taking over, Jean's skin darkens, veining appears on her face, and her eyes go black. We went through hundreds of iterations with different degrees of darkness, with more or fewer visible veins. At the end, we went for a 'less is more' look and made the effect more sublle - but still enough to give Jean a scary look.

Reception

Joe Garza of Slashfilm ranked Jean Grey from the X-Men film series 1st in their "Most Powerful X-Men Characters" list. Alexandra Moroca of CBR.com ranked Jean Grey 1st in their "10 Strongest X-Men In The Fox Movies" list. The A.V. Club ranked Framke Janssen's Jean Grey 60th in their "100 best Marvel characters" list.

Famke Janssen received praise from multiple critics for her portrayal of Jean Grey. Scoot Allan of CBR.com ranked Janssen's performance 4th in their "10 Best Performances In The X-Men Movies" list, writing, "Janssen brought the character’s love for Scott Summers and her interest in Wolverine to the big screen. She also perfectly portrayed Jean’s struggle with her powers that ultimately led to her loss of control in X-Men: The Last Stand. Janssen’s portrayal of Jean Grey and her final moments impressed fans." Christian Bone of Starburst  ranked Janssen's performance 8th in their "10 Greatest Performances in the X-Men Movies" list, stating, "Though most famous to film fans at the time as the OTT Xenia Onatopp in Goldeneye, Famke Janssen proved to be the best choice to bring Jean Grey to life in the original X-Men trilogy. Her Jean is a gentle, caring woman who nonetheless has an apocalyptic power within her that she can’t comprehend." K.J. Stewart of WhatCulture ranked Janssen's performance 25th in their "50 Greatest Performances In Marvel Movies" list, saying, "Janssen has had to portray both the good Jean Grey and the malevolent Phoenix and each role has been performed comfortable. She has conveyed the wise and moral Jean just as well as the evil Phoenix entity." The A.V. Club stated, "Janssen is the emotional anchor of those early X-Men movies, setting a high standard for psychological honesty as a method to cut through some overwhelming X-Men lore that requires a Cerebro to decode. Watching Janssen’s big Moses moment during X2's climax, it’s clear that she’s a pioneer in these massive CGI set-pieces."

Hugh Armitage and Simon Reynolds of Digital Spy called Sophie Turner's portrayal of Jean Grey "hugely likable" across X-Men: Apocalypse. Robin Reynolds of MovieWeb ranked Turner's portrayal as Jean Grey in X-Men: Apocalypse and Dark Phoenix 2nd in their "Sophie Turner's 5 Best Performances" list, writing, "The best part about having Turner play this character is getting to see how Jean transforms over the course of the films. Her acting is top-notch, and she brings so much depth to the character's struggles that anyone can relate."

Accolades

Merchandising 
The Jean Grey from the first 2000 film was released as an action figure by Toy Biz in 2000. The figure has been criticized as "a static, unflattering, and oddly posed representation of Famke Janssen." The 2007 "Dark Phoenix" version of Jean Grey from X-Men: The Last Stand has been released as an action figure in Marvel Legends series.

References

Primary

Secondary

External links
 Jean Grey (original timeline) at Marvel Database
 Jean Grey (new timeline) at Marvel Database

X-Men (film series) characters
Film characters introduced in 2000
Female characters in film
Fictional avatars
Fictional characters from New York (state)
Fictional characters with fire or heat abilities
Fictional matricides
Fictional mariticides
Fictional mass murderers
Fictional characters with dissociative identity disorder
Fictional schoolteachers
Female film villains
Fictional characters with energy-manipulation abilities
Fictional characters with precognition
Marvel Comics characters who have mental powers
Marvel Comics female superheroes
Marvel Comics film characters
Marvel Comics mutants
Marvel Comics superheroes 
Marvel Comics telekinetics
Marvel Comics telepaths
X-Men members
Film supervillains